Doo or DOO may refer to:

Acronyms
 DOO, driver-only operation, an alternative term for One Person Train Operation
 Društvo sa ograničenom odgovornošću - d.o.o. (d.o.o./д.о.о. or D.O.O./Д.О.О.), a type of business entity in Serbia and Croatia
 Društvo so ograničena odgovornost, a type of private limited company in North Macedonia
 Družba z omejeno odgovornostjo, a form of corporation in Slovenia; see Intercity passenger transport (LPP)

People
George Thomas Doo (1800–1886), English engraver
Rulers of the Duala people who lived on the Wouri River estuary of Cameroon:
Elame a Doo, Duala ruler
Priso a Doo, Duala ruler

Other uses
Doo (bird), the dove in Scottish English
Doo (film), a 2010 Tamil language film

See also
 
 Do (disambiguation)
 Doe (disambiguation)
 Doh (disambiguation)
 Doo-doo